Catoptria gozmanyi is a species of moth in the family Crambidae. It is found in Romania, Bulgaria, the Republic of Macedonia, Greece and Italy.

References

Crambini
Moths of Europe
Moths described in 1956